Stuart McCaffrey (born 30 May 1979) is a Scottish former professional football defender, who last played for Scottish club Greenock Morton.

Playing career
McCaffrey began his career as a trainee with Hibernian, before signing for Aberdeen in July 1998. Failing to break into the Aberdeen first team, he signed on loan for Inverness Caledonian Thistle in September 2000. This was followed by a permanent contract.

McCaffrey made more than 150 appearances for Inverness, and has scored five goals. He was part of the Inverness defence, playing alongside the likes of Bobby Mann, Stuart Golabek, Ross Tokely, Grant Munro and Darren Dods. McCaffrey joined St Johnstone on a six-month loan on 31 December 2007, and made the move permanent in April 2008.

McCaffrey has Scottish Challenge Cup and Scottish Football League First Division winner's medals, both won whilst playing for Inverness. He has become a regular in the heart of the St Johnstone defence, and has also scored a few goals. Unfortunately, he also scored an own goal in a Scottish Cup tie against Rangers, when he diverted a cross ball past Alan Main.

After being restricted to 12 appearances for Saints during the 2009–10 season due to injuries, McCaffrey signed for Greenock Morton on a free transfer in July 2010.

Following a tear of his Plantar fascia mid-season, in May he announced that he would be taking a break from football but had not yet planned to retire.

Coaching career

McCaffrey is currently working towards his B licence.

Personal life
McCaffrey is married, his wife Rachel (who is a teacher at Loudoun Academy) gave birth to their beautiful daughter Martha on 4 September 2011.

References

External links

See also 

Greenock Morton F.C. season 2010–11 | 2011–12

1979 births
Aberdeen F.C. players
Association football defenders
Greenock Morton F.C. players
Hibernian F.C. players
Inverness Caledonian Thistle F.C. players
Living people
Footballers from Glasgow
Scottish Football League players
Scottish footballers
Scottish Premier League players
St Johnstone F.C. players